Cleveland railway station is located on the Cleveland line in Queensland, Australia. It serves the suburb of Cleveland in the Redland City.

History
In 1889, the Cleveland line was extended from Manly to the original Cleveland station. In 1897, the line was extended to the second Cleveland station.

Cleveland station opened as the Raby Bay railway station in 1914. On 1 November 1960, the station closed when the line was truncated to Lota. When the station reopened on 24 October 1987, the former Raby Bay station became the third to carry the name Cleveland.

Incidents
On 31 January 2013, a passenger train, IMU173, overshot the railway line and collided with the station, severely damaging a toilet block and the railway station and injuring 14 people. The train was removed from the station in the early hours of the following morning.

Services
Cleveland is the terminus for Cleveland line services to and from Shorncliffe, Northgate, Doomben and Bowen Hills.

Services by platform

Transport links
Transdev Queensland operate seven routes from Cleveland station:
250: To Redland Bay or To Brisbane City via Carindale (Peak-Hour) or Carindale (Off-Peak)
252: to Capalaba via Ormiston and Alexandra Hills
255: to Birkdale via Wellington Point
258: To Toondah Harbour (best for SeaLink WaterTaxi to North Stradbroke Island)
272: To Victoria Point via Thornlands and Redland Hospital
274: To Victoria Point Jetty via Thornlands
275: To Thornlands or To Brisbane City via Capalaba (Peak Hour Service)

References

External links

Cleveland station Queensland Rail
Cleveland station Queensland's Railways on the Internet
[ Cleveland station] TransLink travel information

Railway accidents in 2013
Railway accidents and incidents in Queensland
Railway stations in Australia opened in 1914
Cleveland, Queensland
Railway stations in Redland City
January 2013 events in Australia